Robertson may refer to:

People
 Robertson (surname) (includes a list of people with this name)
 Robertson (given name)
 Clan Robertson, a Scottish clan
 Robertson, stage name of Belgian magician Étienne-Gaspard Robert (1763–1837)

Places

Australia
 Division of Robertson, electoral district in the Australian House of Representatives, in New South Wales
 Robertson, New South Wales
 Robertson, Queensland
 Robertson Barracks, an Australian Army base near Darwin, Northern Territory

United States
 Robertson Boulevard (Los Angeles), California
 Robertson Gymnasium, University of California, Santa Barbara
 Robertson Field (Connecticut), a public airport
 Robertson County, Kentucky
 Robertson Field (North Dakota), a public airport
 Robertson Tunnel, Portland, Oregon, a light rail transit tunnel
 Robertson County, Tennessee
 Robertson County, Texas
 Robertson Stadium, University of Houston, Houston, Texas
 Robertson's Colony, Texas
 Robertson, Wyoming

Elsewhere
 Cape Robertson, Antarctica
Cape Robertson, Greenland
 Robertson (crater), on the Moon
 Robertson, Western Cape, South Africa
 Robertson Island, Antarctica
 Robertson Islands, Antarctica
 Robertson Fjord, Greenland

Other uses
 Robertson's, a UK brand of marmalades and jams
 Robertson screwdriver, a square-shaped screwdriver
 Robertson Panel, commissioned by the CIA in 1952 to investigate unidentified flying objects
 Robertson Scholars Program, a joint program at Duke University and the University of North Carolina at Chapel Hill
 Robertson graph, in mathematics graph theory
 The Robertson Brothers, Australian singing trio
 Robertson College, a Canadian private career college

See also 
 Roberts (disambiguation)
 Roberson (disambiguation)
 Robinson (disambiguation)
 Robson (disambiguation)
 Justice Robertson (disambiguation)